Sripat Singh College, established in 1949, is a college in Jiaganj, in Murshidabad district, in the state of West Bengal in India. It offers undergraduate courses in arts and sciences and postgraduate course in Bengali only. It is affiliated to  University of Kalyani.

History 

The Jain Sitamber Zamindar of Jiaganj, Sripat Singh Dugar decided to establish a college for higher education in the oldest municipality of Murshidabad district. In April, 1949, he gifted magnificent palatial out-house at Jiaganj with a donation of Rs. 75000 to fulfill his dream which is now Sripat Singh College. On 1 May 1949, the college was affiliated with the University of Calcutta, and on 1 August 1949 it began its journey as a co-educational intermediate College, and from 1 July 1954, as a government sponsored co-educational Degree College.

Departments

Science
Chemistry (hons/gen)
Physics (hons/gen)
Mathematics (hons/gen)
Botany (hons/gen)
Zoology (hons/gen)
Environmental Science (hons)
Molecular Biology & Biotechnology (hons)
Molecular Biology (gen)
Computer Science (gen)

Arts
Bengali (hons/gen)
English (hons/gen)
Sanskrit (hons/gen)
History (hons/gen)
Geography (hons)
Political Science (hons/gen)
Philosophy (hons/gen)
Economics (hons/gen)
Physical Education (gen)

Accreditation
The college is recognized by the University Grants Commission (UGC). It has been accredited by the National Assessment and Accreditation Council (NAAC), and awarded B grade in 2016.

Sripat Singh College Post Office
In premises donated by Sripat Singh Dugar and within the college compound there is a regular Sub Post Office named after the college-Sripat Singh College B.O. with all sorts of facilities including telephone service as P.C.O., including the Savings Bank.

Banking facility in Sripat Singh College
Within the college compound there is also a branch of Bank of Baroda with all sorts of banking facilities.

Notable alumni
Arijit Singh, playback singer and a music programmer

See also

References

External links

Sripat Singh College
University of Kalyani
University Grants Commission
National Assessment and Accreditation Council

Colleges affiliated to University of Kalyani
Educational institutions established in 1949
Universities and colleges in Murshidabad district
1949 establishments in India